The New Hampshire Marine Memorial is a mid-sized statue of New England granite on a tiered granite base. Designed in Classical style by Concord, New Hampshire design expert Alice Ericson Cosgrove and sculpted by Vincenzo Andreani, the memorial, dedicated to all New Hampshire servicepersons lost at sea due to warfare, is located in Hampton Beach, New Hampshire and was dedicated May 30, 1957.

The statue depicts a kneeling woman gazing out to sea, a laurel wreath in her hands. Close by the statue is a quarter-circle of granite into which are cut the names of men lost to the sea.

External links 

 
 Photo
 New Hampshire Marine Memorial - article from the Lane Memorial Library, Hampton, NH
 New Hampshire Marine Memorial on SIRIS Art Inventory (Smithsonian Institution)

Buildings and structures in Rockingham County, New Hampshire
Marine Memorial
Tourist attractions in Rockingham County, New Hampshire
1957 sculptures
Granite sculptures in New Hampshire
1957 establishments in New Hampshire
1950s establishments in New Hampshire
Hampton, New Hampshire
Sculptures of women in New Hampshire
Statues in New Hampshire
Outdoor sculptures in New Hampshire